Crassagena depressa is a species of beetle in the family Carabidae, the only species in the genus Crassagena.

References

Lebiinae